Peter Conover Hains (July 6, 1840 – November 7, 1921) was a major general in the United States Army, and a veteran of the American Civil War, Spanish–American War, and the First World War. He is best known for his engineering efforts, such as the creation of the Tidal Basin in Washington, D.C., and for laying out the Panama Canal.

Early life and career
Hains was born in Philadelphia, Pennsylvania. He was appointed to the United States Military Academy from New Jersey, and graduated from West Point ranking 19th in the Class of June 1861. Among his classmates were Medal of Honor recipient First Lieutenant Alonzo Cushing, and Major Generals George Custer, USA, and Pierce Manning Butler Young, CSA.

Civil War
Commissioned and promoted second and first lieutenant in the 2nd U.S. Artillery on June 24, 1861, Hains briefly commanded Battery M, 2nd U.S. Artillery, in the U.S. Horse Artillery Brigade, until transferring to the Corps of Topographical Engineers on July 24, 1862. He won a brevet promotion to captain on May 22, 1862, for actions at Hanover Court House. Less than a year later, on March 3, 1863, Hains transferred again—this time into the Corps of Engineers.

During the Siege of Vicksburg, Hains was cited for meritorious conduct (serving as the acting/interim chief engineer of the XIII Corps), and was awarded a brevet promotion to major upon the capture of the city, July 4, 1863. Promoted to captain in the Engineers on July 18, he served out the remainder of the war, and received a brevet promotion to lieutenant colonel for his service during the war.

Postbellum career

Hains remained with the regular army following the war, and was promoted to major in September 1870. Much of his notable post-war service was in designing lighthouses for the U.S. Lighthouse Board. Among other accomplishments, Hains designed the Morris Island and St. Augustine lighthouses. He was the chief engineer for the construction of The Morris Island Lighthouse at the entrance the harbor at Charleston South Carolina 1872-1876. He became a lieutenant colonel in 1886 and was promoted to colonel in August 1895. He designed the Tidal Basin in Washington, D.C., thus solving the drainage problems and foul smell of most of the Washington area marshlands. The tip of East Potomac Park is named Hains Point in honor of Peter Conover Hains.

Still in the Army during the Spanish–American War, Hains served as a brigadier general of volunteers from August to November 1898. He was promoted to brigadier general in the Regular Army on April 21, 1903. He successfully lobbied for the construction of the Panama Canal site over one proposed in Nicaragua.

Hains retired from active service in 1904, having reached the mandatory retirement age of 64.

Later life

On August 15, 1908, two of his three sons, Peter C. Hains II and Thornton Jenkins Hains, a well-known author of sea stories, were involved in the murder of William E. Annis at the Bayside Yacht Club, Long Island. The crime, and the subsequent separate trials for the brothers, became one of the notorious cases of its day, front-page news across the country. Thornton was acquitted in January 1909; Peter was convicted of manslaughter in May 1909 and sent to Sing Sing, but, on General Hains' appeal, was pardoned by the Governor of New York in 1911. The General spent much of his savings financing the defense of his sons.

In recognition of his long and distinguished career, General Hains was promoted to major general on the retired list in 1916.

He was recalled to active duty during the First World War, in September 1917, at the age of 77. He served as the chief engineer for the Norfolk Harbor and River District and then as chief engineer for the Eastern Division of the Corps of Engineers. He left active duty in the fall of 1918.

Hains was the oldest officer to serve on active duty since Major General John E. Wool retired in 1863 at the age of 79. (The oldest active duty officer in the history of the U.S. Army was Brevet Brigadier General John Walbach who died on active duty in 1857 at the age of 90.) He was also, probably, the only person to serve on active duty with the U.S. Army in both the American Civil War and the First World War.

General Hains died at Walter Reed Hospital on November 7, 1921, and was buried in Arlington National Cemetery. His widow died in 1925 and was buried beside him.

He was a member of the Military Order of the Loyal Legion of the United States and the Military Order of Foreign Wars.

Honors
Hains Point in Washington is named in memory of General Hains.

The honor of oldest Army officer to serve belongs to Hains, who was in uniform at the age of 76. He was a classmate of George Armstrong Custer at West Point and ordered the first shot fired by the Union artillery at the Battle of Bull Run. He retired in 1904, was recalled to duty twelve years later for service during World War I, the only Civil War Officer to see duty in World War I.

Military family
His sons, John Power Hains and Peter Hains Jr., were both army officers.  His grandson and namesake, Peter C. Hains, III, was also a major general in the U.S. Army.  All are buried at Arlington National Cemetery. Further, his greatgrandson, Peter C. Hains IV, COL USA and great-greatgrandson, John Power Hains II, MAJ USA served as Army officers while another great-greatgrandson, Paul Hains, LT. COL USA served as an Army National Guard officer.

Dates of rank
 Cadet, USMA – July 1, 1857
 2nd Lieutenant – June 24, 1861
 1st Lieutenant – June 24, 1861
 Brevet Captain – May 27, 1862
 Captain – July 18, 1863
 Brevet Major – July 4, 1863
 Brevet Lieutenant Colonel – March 13, 1865
 Major – September 22, 1870
 Lieutenant Colonel – September 16, 1886
 Colonel – August 13, 1895
 Brigadier General, Volunteers – May 27, 1898
 Discharged from Volunteers – November 30, 1898
 Brigadier General – April 21, 1903
 Retired – July 6, 1904
 Major General, Retired List – August 20, 1916

See also

Notes

References
 Arlington National Cemetery, Arlington, Virginia
 
 Register of Graduates and Former Cadets of the United States Military Academy. West Point, NY: West Point Alumni Foundation, Inc., 1970.
 U.S. War Department, The War of the Rebellion: a Compilation of the Official Records of the Union and Confederate Armies, U.S. Government Printing Office, 1880–1901.

External links
 

United States Army generals of World War I
Union Army officers
People of Pennsylvania in the American Civil War
People of the Spanish–American War
Burials at Arlington National Cemetery
1840 births
1921 deaths
United States Army generals
United States Army Corps of Engineers personnel
United States Military Academy alumni
Military personnel from Philadelphia